Madhavaram, is a village in Mantralayam Taluk, Kurnool district in the state of Andhra Pradesh in India.

Demographics

References

External links 

Cities and towns in Kurnool district